Nolan River is a river in north central Texas, running through Johnson County and Hill County and is part of the Brazos River drainage basin. The Nolan's headwaters are in farm land in northwest Johnson County.

In 1961, the Nolan River was dammed at Highway 67, west of the city of Cleburne, submerging the site of Wardville, the original county seat of Johnson County. The reservoir, named Lake Pat Cleburne, is the municipal water source for the city of Cleburne and serves as a recreational body for the county. The Nolan, north of the dam, is a narrow, tree-lined, slow-moving, rather shallow stream primarily flowing through private farm land, and is popular with anglers. Below the lake, the river takes on a different character as it flows through limestone bluffs with a hard-packed clay and gravel river bottom, and the banks are vegetated with many species of large trees. The river, below the dam, flows with a considerable volume of water, . The stream contains significant fish populations and is home to the great blue heron and snowy egret. The river bends sharply in some places and has very limited straight length. The lower part of the Nolan River is popular for canoeing and kayaking and rapids in some areas create very fast-moving water for challenging recreational activities.

The Nolan River has one primary tributary, Buffalo Creek, which has its confluence with the Nolan less than a mile southeast of Lake Pat Cleburne.

Philip Nolan
Four miles south of Rio Vista on Highway 174 is a marker erected to the memory of Philip Nolan (1771–1801). This is on the Hill County side and a small cemetery is west-northwest in the timber, near the river. The river is named after Philip Nolan, who was known to have been a horse trader to the U.S. Army in 1791.

See also
 List of rivers of Texas

References

 
 USGS Geographic Names Information Service
 USGS Hydrologic Unit Map - State of Texas (1974)
 Place Names.com http://www.placenames.com/us/p1342646/

Rivers of Texas
Brazos River
Rivers of Johnson County, Texas
Rivers of Hill County, Texas